Buranda railway station is located on the Cleveland line in Queensland, Australia. It is one of two stations serving the Brisbane suburb of Woolloongabba, the other being Park Road.

West of the station, the line joins the Beenleigh line via a triangle junction.

History
Buranda station opened in 1889 as Logan Road, being renamed Buranda in 1917.

On 15 July 1996, the Fisherman Islands line to the Port of Brisbane opened to the north of the station.

In the early hours of 29 March 2009, the main station building on platform one was destroyed by fire. A 17-year-old man was later charged with one count of arson following the incident.

Services
Buranda is served by Cleveland line services from Shorncliffe, Northgate, Doomben and Bowen Hills to Cannon Hill, Manly and Cleveland.

Services by platform

Transport links
Adjacent to the station lies Buranda busway station that is served by Brisbane Transport services.

References

External links

Buranda station Queensland Rail
Buranda station Queensland's Railways on the Internet
[ Buranda station] TransLink travel information

Railway stations in Brisbane
Railway stations in Australia opened in 1889
Woolloongabba